James Gopsill (July 22, 1823 – July 26, 1884) was the fifteenth Mayor of Jersey City from May 6, 1867 to May 3, 1868.

Biography 
He was born in 1823 in New York City to an immigrant from England. He worked as a clerk in a dry goods store. He moved to Jersey City, New Jersey in 1840 and set up his own dry goods store. Gopsill became the president of the Hudson Insurance Company and founded the Children's Home for Orphans. In the 1860s, he began publishing city directories.

Gopsill was a delegate from New Jersey at the 1868 Republican National Convention in Chicago and a member of the Republican National Committee from New Jersey from 1868 to 1872.

He died from angina while on vacation with his wife in Cornwall-on-Hudson, New York on July 26, 1884.

Legacy
He is the grandfather of Assemblyman Thomas Gopsill.

References 

1823 births
1884 deaths
Politicians from New York City
New Jersey Republicans
Mayors of Jersey City, New Jersey
19th-century American politicians